St Margaret's School is an independent boarding and day school co-educational aged 2–18 in Bushey, Hertfordshire.

The school is currently in the process of becoming co-educational. There are currently male students in the junior school, and in sixth form. St Margaret's is planning to go fully co-educational by 2022.

History
In 1749 the Society of Stewards and Subscribers for Maintaining and Educating Poor Orphans of Clergymen was set up in London and charitable donations to it were made by wealthy people, including the royal family and politicians. In 1760 Princess Amelia gave £100 and in 1791 George III donated £500, being part of the proceeds of one of Mr Handel's musical performances in Westminster Abbey.  A school for 20 girls was set up in a house in Southwark, London, and the boys were sent to an existing school in Thirsk, North Yorkshire.

On 28 April 1809, the Society was Incorporated at the sole expense of the Bishop of Durham and it became the Clergy Orphan Corporation.  The Clergy Orphan Corporation paid for a new school building to be erected on land bought in St John's Wood next to Lord's Cricket Ground, and both boys and girls moved there in 1812. In 1852 the boys moved to Canterbury (now St Edmund's School).

The St John's Wood site was sold in 1895 to the Manchester, Sheffield and Lincoln Railway and the school building demolished. Today the Lord's Indoor Cricket School stands on the exact site of the old Clergy Orphan Corporation School.  The eminent architect Alfred Waterhouse was commissioned to design and build a new school on land bought at Bushey, Hertfordshire and, while this was being done, the girls moved to temporary premises at Windsor.  The new school was ready by 1897 and in September of that year, 80 clergy orphans, their teachers and formidable Headmistress, Miss Emily Baylee, moved in.  This Waterhouse building is Grade II listed. Miss Baylee renamed the school after Saint Margaret of Scotland, who was thought to be a good role model for the girls.

In 1902 the first fee-paying pupils were admitted and in 1940 the first day girls were admitted.  In 1996 the two schools, St Margaret's at Bushey and St Edmund's at Canterbury, ceased to be owned by the Clergy Orphan Corporation and became fully independent schools.

St Margaret's is now solely a fee-charging school.

Notable former pupils

The Old Girls' Association of St Margaret's was established in 1897; in 1909 it assumed the name of "St Margaret's Guild".

The Guild is very active and maintains contacts with old girls and produces an annual magazine. An annual central London reunion is held along with various regional meetings; the current association membership is around 2,000.

 Christabel Bielenberg 1909–2003 (née Burton), author 
 Penelope Chetwode 1910–86, author
 Sally Connolly 1976–, author and academic
 Dame Jillian Ellison, head of Nurse Directors Association
 Evelyn Emmet, Baroness Emmet of Amberley, Conservative MP for East Grinstead, 1955–64
 Frances Gibb, Legal Editor of The Times 
 Unity Mitford 1914–48, one of the notorious Mitford sisters and alleged mistress of Adolf Hitler
 Violet Pakenham 1912–2002, author 
 Emma Samms 1960–, actress 
 Brigid Simmonds OBE, Chief Executive of Business in Sport and Leisure and Chair of the Central Council of Physical Recreation
 Nicola Floss, 1989-, Model, Motivational Speaker, Beauty Queen & Actress.

References

External links
School website

Private schools in Hertfordshire
Girls' schools in Hertfordshire
Boarding schools in Hertfordshire
Relocated schools
Educational institutions established in 1749
1749 establishments in England